Preston Shannon (October 23, 1947 – January 22, 2018) was an American electric blues and soul blues guitarist, singer and songwriter.

AllMusic noted that "Shannon's speciality is a blend of Southern-fried soul and blues, and his albums and live shows – always with a horn section – are an eclectic mix of danceable, grooving tunes and slow, soulful ballads". Among the songs he wrote are "Beale Street Boogaloo" and "Midnight in Memphis".

Life and career
He was born in Olive Branch, Mississippi, and relocated with his family to nearby Memphis, Tennessee, at the age of eight. Despite initial misgiving from his Pentecostal parents, Shannon developed an interest in the blues and played part-time with several local bands, whilst his daytime occupation was with a hardware firm. He began a full-time musical career when he secured a spot in Shirley Brown's backing ensemble.

In 1993, his own Preston Shannon Band played at the Long Beach Blues Festival in Long Beach, California. After being spotted leading his own band in Memphis' Beale Street clubs, he signed to Rounder Records subsidiary, Bullseye Blues, and released his debut solo effort, Break the Ice in 1994. After this followed the Willie Mitchell produced efforts, Midnight in Memphis (1996) and All in Time (1999). However, with no immediate follow-up available, Preston lost momentum. After moving to Title Tunes, he released Be with Me Tonight (2006).

Shannon played at Memphis in May in both 2008 and 2011. In February 2012, Shannon appeared on season two of The Voice, singing "In the Midnight Hour".

He was a regular performer at B.B. King's Blues Club in Memphis. Shannon's final studio recorded album was Dust My Broom (2014).

Death
Preston died of cancer on January 22, 2018, in Memphis, Tennessee, at the age of 70.

Discography

Albums

Singles

See also
List of electric blues musicians
List of soul-blues musicians

References

External links
Official website

1947 births
2018 deaths
American blues singers
African-American male singers
American blues guitarists
African-American male guitarists
Electric blues musicians
Blues musicians from Mississippi
Soul-blues musicians
Songwriters from Mississippi
People from Olive Branch, Mississippi
Guitarists from Mississippi
Musicians from Memphis, Tennessee
20th-century American guitarists
20th-century American male musicians
African-American male songwriters